The 2022 St. Petersburg Ladies' Trophy was a professional tennis tournament played on indoor hard courts. It was the 13th edition of the event and a WTA 500 tournament on the 2022 WTA Tour. It was held between 6 and 13 February 2022.

Champions

Singles 

  Anett Kontaveit def.  Maria Sakkari, 5–7, 7–6(7–4), 7–5

Doubles 

  Anna Kalinskaya /  Caty McNally def.  Alicja Rosolska /  Erin Routliffe, 6–3, 6–7(5–7), [10–4]

Point distribution

Prize money 

1Qualifiers prize money is also the Round of 32 prize money.
*per team

Singles main draw entrants

Seeds 

1 Rankings as of January 31, 2022.

Other entrants 
The following players received wildcards into the singles main draw: 
  Petra Kvitová
  Kamilla Rakhimova
  Wang Xinyu
  Vera Zvonareva

The following players received entry from the qualifying draw:
  Varvara Gracheva 
  Kaja Juvan 
  Jule Niemeier 
  Rebecca Peterson

The following player received entry as a lucky loser :
  Bernarda Pera

Withdrawals 
 Before the tournament
  Paula Badosa → replaced by  Irina-Camelia Begu
  Ons Jabeur → replaced by  Aliaksandra Sasnovich
  Anhelina Kalinina → replaced by  Zhang Shuai
  Daria Kasatkina → replaced by  Jaqueline Cristian
  Anastasia Pavlyuchenkova → replaced by  Bernarda Pera
  Karolína Plíšková → replaced by  Alizé Cornet
  Yulia Putintseva → replaced by  Anastasia Potapova
  Sara Sorribes Tormo → replaced by  Andrea Petkovic

During the tournament
  Elena Rybakina

Doubles main draw entrants

Seeds 

1 Rankings as of January 31, 2022.

Other entrants 
The following pair received a wildcard into the doubles main draw:
  Kamilla Rakhimova /  Ekaterina Shalimova

Withdrawals 
 Before the tournament
  Nadiia Kichenok /  Raluca Olaru → replaced by  Sorana Cîrstea /  Raluca Olaru
  Veronika Kudermetova /  Elise Mertens → replaced by  Ekaterina Alexandrova /  Yana Sizikova
  Magda Linette /  Bernarda Pera → replaced by  Irina Bara /  Ekaterine Gorgodze

References

External links 
 

St. Petersburg Ladies' Trophy
St. Petersburg Ladies Trophy
St. Petersburg Ladies' Trophy